Indonesia and the United States established diplomatic relations in 1949. Relations are generally strong and close. Both are republics and recognize the strategic importance of their counterpart.

The Indonesian people have generally viewed the U.S. fairly positively, with 61% of Indonesians viewing the U.S. favorably in 2002, declining slightly down to 54% in 2011, increasing to 59% in 2014, and increasing further to 62% in 2015 (compared to only 26% who had an unfavorable view). Indonesian views of the U.S. have declined significantly during the Trump Administration, with 43% of Indonesians viewing the U.S. positively in 2018 (a near 20 point drop from the end of Barack Obama's term) compared to 42% who viewed the U.S. negatively.

According to the 2012 U.S. Global Leadership Report, 23% of Indonesians approve of U.S. leadership, with 31% disapproving and 46% uncertain.

History

19th Century

In 1831, the natives living in the village of Kuala Batee (located on the island of Sumatra, then part of the Dutch East Indies) massacred the crew of a U.S. merchant ship. This led to the punitive First Sumatran Expedition, a during which U.S. and Dutch troops raided the settlement. 

The U.S. Navy returned to Sumatra during the Second Sumatran Expedition, launched in response to an attack on another U.S. merchant ship by Malay pirates.

1949–1975

Much to the annoyance of the Dutch, the United States played a major role in demanding Indonesian independence in the late 1940s. The Cold War played a critical role as the Indonesian Republic conclusively demonstrated its willingness and ability to suppress internal communist threats, as directed by the Comintern.  U.S. policy since the 1940s has been to support Indonesia and help it avoid communism and was the primary provider of armaments. After Japan, Indonesia was the largest pro-U.S. nation in Asia. It hosted American investments in petroleum and raw materials and controlled a highly strategic location near vital shipping lanes.

The Dutch attempted to regain control of Indonesia after the surrender of Japan. However, under the Japanese occupation, the nationalist new government had arisen that resisted the Netherlands, leading to a four-year armed and diplomatic conflict. The U.S. took the lead in the United Nations demanding a Dutch withdrawal and Washington threatened to cut off Marshall plan aid. Indonesia gained full independence from the Netherlands in 1949. Indonesia nationalized more than a thousand Dutch companies, and nine out of 10 of the Dutch residents returned to the Netherlands, along with thousands of pro-Dutch Indonesians. Although considered a triumph of nationalism, it resulted in a prolonged economic depression due to the country's lack of capital and managerial skills. Indonesia helped sponsor the Non-Aligned Movement along with India and Yugoslavia to assert its independence from both the U.S. and the Soviet Union. When Indonesia started selling rubber to Communist China in the mid-1950s, the Eisenhower administration protested and persuaded Jakarta to cease the sales, allowing friendly relations to resume.

In February 1958 rebels in Sumatra and Sulawesi declared the PRRI-Permesta Movement aimed at overthrowing the Jakarta government. Due to their anti-communist rhetoric, the rebels received money, weapons, and manpower from the CIA. This support ended when Allen Lawrence Pope, an American pilot, was shot down after a bombing raid on government-held Ambon in April 1958. In April 1958, the central government responded by launching airborne and seaborne military invasions on Padang and Manado, the rebel capitals. By the end of 1958, the rebels had been militarily defeated, and the last remaining rebel guerrilla bands surrendered in August 1961.

In 1963, Ann Dunham met Lolo Soetoro at the University of Hawaii; he was an Indonesian East–West Center graduate student in geography. The couple married on Molokai on March 15, 1965. After two one-year extensions of his J-1 visa, Lolo returned to Indonesia in 1966. His wife and stepson Barack Obama followed sixteen months later in 1967. The family initially lived in the Menteng Dalam neighborhood in the Tebet district of South Jakarta. From 1970, they lived in a wealthier neighborhood in the Menteng district of Central Jakarta.

At the age of six, Obama and his mother had moved to Indonesia to join his stepfather. From age six to ten, he attended local Indonesian-language schools: Sekolah Dasar Katolik Santo Fransiskus Asisi (St. Francis of Assisi Catholic Elementary School) for two years and Sekolah Dasar Negeri Menteng 01 (State Elementary School Menteng 01) for one and a half years, supplemented by English-language Calvert School homeschooling by his mother. As a result of his four years in Jakarta, he was able to speak Indonesian fluently as a child. During his time in Indonesia, Obama's stepfather taught him to be resilient and gave him "a pretty hardheaded assessment of how the world works."

The U.S. under President John F. Kennedy intervened in the West New Guinea dispute between Indonesia and the Netherlands, due to Indonesia's purchase of Soviet arms and planned invasion of the territory. U.S. diplomat Ellsworth Bunker brokered the New York Agreement, which eventually ceded West New Guinea to Indonesia in 1969 after a controversial referendum. The administration of Lyndon B. Johnson escalated the war in Vietnam, which greatly heightened tensions with Indonesia in 1964–65. Relations deteriorated further with Indonesia's opposition to the formation of Malaysia that led to war. By mid-1965, Sukarno was edging closer to China, denounced U.S imperialism, and inspired anti-American demonstrations. Following an attempted coup on September 30, 1965, and the ensuing massacres of communists, the pro-Western Suharto came to power in 1968, and the U.S. started providing financial and military aid to Indonesia.

East Timor crisis: 1975–2002

The victory of left-wing Fretilin in a civil war in East Timor caused alarm in Indonesia, which feared a hostile left-wing base that would promote secessionist movements within Indonesia. Anti-Fretilin activists from the other main parties fled to West Timor, a part of Indonesia, and called upon Jakarta to annex the former Portuguese colony. On December 6, 1975, Ford and Kissinger met Indonesian President Suharto in Jakarta and indicated the U.S. would not take a position on East Timor. Indonesia invaded the next day and made East Timor its 27th province. The United Nations, with U.S. support, called for the withdrawal of the Indonesian forces. The 25-year Indonesian occupation of East Timor was characterized by continuous and violent clashes between separatist groups (especially Fretilin) and the Indonesian military. It was not until 1999 that Indonesia relinquished control of East Timor following an Australian-led international intervention. East Timor later became an independent country in 2002.

Recent research into newly opened documents indicates that anti-Communism was not the main reason for Western support of Indonesia's takeover of East Timor. Analysts in Washington and NATO concluded that East Timor was too small and too unstable to survive on its own. Furthermore, there was a clear need to maintain friendly relations with Indonesia due to its growing size and importance in a critical region. Following the invasion, U.S. military aid averaged about $30 million annually throughout the occupation of East Timor, and arms sales increased exponentially under President Jimmy Carter. This policy continued until 1999 when President Bill Clinton was outraged by Indonesia's defiance of East Timor referendum results that heavily favored independence.

Since 2000
With the end of the Cold War in 1989 and the resolution of the East Timor crisis in 2000, relations between Indonesia and the U.S. have been untroubled. By 2000, relations reached an all-time high. Rapprochement was made successful by Indonesia's transition to democracy with free elections, and its effective counter-terrorism strategies. The George W. Bush administration claimed a part of the credit by arguing that the Bush doctrine advocated democracy as an antidote to terrorism, and Indonesia's experience vindicated the doctrine. The Barack Obama administration celebrates shared democratic values and interests and recognizes Indonesia's increasingly influential role in world affairs. Efforts by 2010 were underway for the two countries to create a 'Comprehensive Partnership Agreement' (CPA) encompassing enhanced security, economic and educational engagement, as well as cooperation on transnational issues such as climate change.

Recent relations

The United States has significant economic, commercial, and security interests in Indonesia. It remains a linchpin of regional security due to its strategic location astride several vital international maritime straits, particularly the Malacca Strait. Relations between Indonesia and the U.S. are generally positive and have advanced since the election of President Susilo Bambang Yudhoyono in 2004.

Cooperative relations are maintained today, although no formal security treaties bind the two countries. The U.S. and Indonesia share the common goal of maintaining peace, security, and stability in the region and engaging in a dialogue on threats to regional security. Cooperation between the U.S. and Indonesia on counter-terrorism has increased steadily since 2002, as terrorist attacks in Bali (October 2002 and October 2005), Jakarta (August 2003 and September 2004) and other regional locations demonstrated the presence of terrorist organizations, principally Jemaah Islamiyah, in Indonesia. The U.S. has welcomed Indonesia's contributions to regional security, especially its leading role in helping restore democracy in Cambodia and in mediating territorial disputes in the South China Sea.

The U.S. is committed to consolidating Indonesia's democratic transition and supports the territorial integrity of the country. Nonetheless, there are friction points in the bilateral relations. These conflicts have centered primarily on human rights, as well as on differences in foreign policy. The U.S. Congress cut off grant military training assistance through International Military Education and Training (IMET) to Indonesia in 1992 in response to a November 12, 1991, incident in East Timor when Indonesian security forces shot and killed East Timorese demonstrators. This restriction was partially lifted in 1995. Military assistance programs were again suspended, however, in the aftermath of the violence and destruction in East Timor following the August 30, 1999 referendum favoring independence.

Separately, the U.S. had urged the Indonesian government to identify and bring to justice the perpetrators of the August 2002 ambush murders of two U.S. teachers near Timika, Papua. In 2005, the Secretary of State certified that Indonesian cooperation in the murder investigation had met the conditions set by Congress, enabling the resumption of full IMET. Eight suspects were arrested in January 2006, and in November 2006 seven were convicted.

In November 2005, the Under Secretary of State for Political Affairs, under authority delegated by the Secretary of State, exercised a National Security Waiver provision provided in the FY 2005 Foreign Operations Appropriations Act to remove congressional restrictions on Foreign Military Financing (FMF) and lethal defense articles. These actions represented a reestablishment of normalized military relations, allowing the U.S. to provide more substantial support for Indonesian efforts to reform the military, increase its ability to respond to national and regional disasters, and promote regional stability.

Workers rights

Regarding worker rights, Indonesia was the target of several petitions filed under the Generalized System of Preferences (GSP) legislation arguing that Indonesia did not meet internationally recognized labor standards. A formal GSP review was suspended in February 1994 without terminating GSP benefits for Indonesia. Since 1998, Indonesia has ratified all eight International Labor Organization core conventions on protecting internationally recognized worker rights and allowed trade unions to organize. However, enforcement of labor laws and protection of workers rights remains inconsistent and weak in some areas. Indonesia's slow economic recovery has pushed more workers into the informal sector, which reduces legal protection and could create conditions for increases in child labor.

Development assistances

The U.S. Agency for International Development (USAID) and its predecessors have provided development assistance to Indonesia since 1950. Initial assistance focused on the most urgent needs of the new republic, including food aid, infrastructure rehabilitation, health care, and training. For thirty years, between 1967 and 2007, U.S. aid to Indonesia was provided within the arrangements of, first, the Inter-Governmental Group on Indonesia, and later the Consultative Group on Indonesia. Through the 1970s, a time of enormous economic growth in Indonesia, USAID played a significant role in helping the country achieve self-sufficiency in rice production and in reducing the birth rate. Today, USAID assistance programs focus on primary education, democratic governance, rebuilding after the 2004 tsunami, economic growth, health, water, food, and the environment.

Improving the quality of decentralized education
In October 2003, President Bush announced a $157 million Indonesian Education Initiative for 2004–2009 to improve the quality of education in Indonesia. This initiative is a cornerstone of the U.S. Government assistance program in Indonesia, directly responding to Indonesia's priorities and reflecting a joint Indonesia-U.S. commitment to revitalize education for the next generation of Indonesia's leaders.

Managing basic education (MBE)
Since 2003, this project has worked with local governments to strengthen their capacity to effectively manage primary education services in 20 districts/municipalities in East and Central Java, Aceh, and Jakarta. MBE is also working with 10,000 educators to improve the quality of teaching and learning in grades 1–9 through in-service teacher training, community participation, and the promotion of school-based management. MBE directly reaches 450 schools, 20% of which are madrassah, and 140,000 students. Through dissemination of good practices, teachers from 2,000 additional schools received training last year.

Decentralized basic education (DBE)
The Indonesia Education Initiative will increase the quality of basic education in primary and junior secondary schools, both public and private, and focus on three results: (DBE1) Local governments and communities more effectively manage education services; (DBE2) Enhance the quality of teaching and learning to improve student performance in critical subjects such as math, science, and reading; and (DBE3) Youth gain more relevant life and work skills to better compete for jobs in the future.

Opportunities for vulnerable children
This program promotes inclusive education in Indonesia. Children with special needs, such as visual impairment are provided with the opportunity to be educated in public schools. Replicable models are being developed to expand the reach of the program.

Sesame Street Indonesia
An Indonesian co-production of the award-winning television show targeting young children is being developed and produced by the Sesame Workshop in New York with local Indonesian partners and USAID funding. Millions of Indonesian children will be better equipped to start school. The first season of the show, titled Jalan Sesama, was first aired in 2008.

Effective democracy and decentralized governance
This objective aims to support democratic reforms by supporting effective and accountable local governance, addressing conflict and encouraging pluralism, and consolidating national-level democratic reforms.

Mitigation of conflict and support for peace
USAID remains a crucial donor working to mitigate conflict and support peace in conflict areas, such as Aceh, Papua, Sulawesi, and Ambon. Assistance activities focus on: conflict resolution/mitigation; civilian-military affairs; livelihoods development in conflict areas; drafting and monitoring of relevant legislation; and emergency and post-conflict transitional assistance to conflict-affected persons.

Anti-trafficking in persons
USAID's anti-trafficking programs work closely with the Ministry of Women's Empowerment and civil society groups in policymaking, program development, victim support, and dissemination of information which will contribute to reducing the trafficking of women and children in Indonesia.

Justice sector reforms
Through the Democratic Reform Support Program and Justice Sector Reform Program, USAID's current Justice Sector programs provide technical assistance and training to judges, prosecutors and staff members at the Supreme Court, the Constitutional Court, and the Attorney General's Office.

Legislative strengthening
Technical assistance and training are provided to strengthen the legislative and legal drafting skills of parliamentarians as well as provide institutional support to the National House of Representatives, National Regional Representative Council, nine provincial legislative councils and 40 district-level legislative councils. Activities include promoting constituency and media outreach; developing the capacity to draft and analyze legislation and operational budgets; creating inter-party coalitions; encouraging legislative commissions to carry out their functions and perform strategic planning.

The local governance support program
Currently assisting 60 local governments, this program works to increase governmental accountability and transparency, strengthen the local legislative process, promote citizen engagement and civil service reform, and improve the delivery of basic services.

Media development
In October 2005, USAID funded a new media development project entitled "Building on the Foundations: Strengthening Professional, Responsible and Responsive Broadcast Media in Indonesia." The goal of the program is to build professional, information-based local media that are responsive to the development and reform of districts across Indonesia. The program assists local radio stations in North Sumatra, Aceh and Java, fostering dialogue on media regulations, and providing support for media and media education in Aceh.

Tsunami Reconstruction
The U.S. Government was one of the first donors to respond to the disaster and remains one of the most significant contributors to relief and reconstruction efforts in Indonesia. Through numerous grants to non-governmental organizations (NGOs), international organizations, and United Nations agencies, USAID has helped stabilize the humanitarian situation in Aceh, avert a public health crisis, and provide relief services to survivors.

Rebuilding shelter and key infrastructure
USAID is assisting communities by providing much-needed shelter, working with the Indonesian government to rebuild vital infrastructure, and ensuring proper mapping and planning is considered through local cooperation.

Restoring livelihoods
USAID enables communities to direct capacity building to benefit people at the local level. USAID's Community Based Recovery Initiative is working with 59 villages to organize local capacity-building initiatives.

Strengthening capacity and governance
USAID is assisting in restoring local government services in Aceh, working to increase governmental accountability and transparency, strengthen the local legislative process, promote citizen engagement and civil service reform, and improve the delivery of basic services.

Economic growth strengthened and employment created
Assistance to the Indonesian government and private sector focuses on creating jobs by improving the business and investment climate, combating corruption, increasing competitiveness in key sectors, and improving the safety of the financial system. USAID is working with Indonesians to ensure that future generations enjoy an increasingly prosperous, democratic and stable country.

Business climate and enterprise development
Efforts to promote a transparent and predictable legal and regulatory business climate aim to reduce the hidden costs of doing business, to reduce uncertainty, and to promote trade, investment and job creation. USAID delivers technical assistance to leading industry sectors to fuel growth, exports, jobs, and prosperity. These efforts drive increased productivity and national competitiveness by forging stronger coalitions of public, private, and civil society advocates for legal, regulatory, and policy change.

Financial sector safety and soundness
USAID is working to improve the oversight of bank and non-bank financial intermediaries in order to promote safety and soundness in the financial system and to improve transparency and governance.

Improving the quality of basic human services
The USAID Basic Human Services Office assists Indonesia through an integrated strategy combining health, food/nutrition, and environmental management and water services at the district and community levels.

Environmental services
This program supports better health through improved water resources management and expanded access to clean water and sanitation services. With a ridge to reef approach, partners improve water resource management from watershed sources, along rivers, through cities, and to coastal reefs. In the upper watershed, the program promotes forest management, biodiversity conservation, and land use planning to protect a steady, year-round source of clean water. Further downstream, the program strengthens municipal water utilities to improve and expand piped water and sanitation services to communities. Stakeholder forums link upstream and downstream communities to build consensus on water and waste management issues. Marginalized urban communities also benefit from the introduction of safe drinking water through Air Rahmat, a home chlorination product being introduced to the market through a public-private partnership.

Health services
Women, newborns and children are the principal beneficiaries of this integrated public health program. Working with the government, NGOs, and other partners, USAID focuses on maternal, neonatal and child health; reproductive health; nutrition; HIV/AIDS, tuberculosis, malaria; and decentralization of the health sector. Improved health-seeking behaviors within communities link key hygiene promotion interventions, such as hand-washing with soap, in order to reduce diarrheal disease, a major cause of childhood death. New initiatives address challenges from the re-emergence of polio and the outbreak of avian influenza in Indonesia.

Food and nutrition

Improving the nutritional status of Indonesians, USAID food assistance targets impoverished communities. These activities directly impact women and children through targeted supplemental feeding and nutritional education activities. The food assistance program works with villages to construct public latrines, washing facilities, protected water stations, and to organize solid waste disposal efforts to better protect community health. Over one million people will be direct recipients of USAID food assistance under this program.

At America 
In December 2010, the United States reached out to the Indonesian youth by establishing @america, a high-tech, interactive operation heralded as the digital-age successor to the venerable American Cultural Center. It is also American public diplomacy's latest effort to win over young foreigners, especially in Muslim countries. @america represents the U.S. government's first attempt at creating a full-fledged cultural center since the September 11, 2001 attacks.

@america is a cutting-edge, 21st-century cultural center where visitors can explore and experience the U.S., and express their thoughts and ideas about America. At @america, visitors could discover state-of-the-art technology and learn more about the U.S. Through discussions, webchats, cultural performances, debates, competitions, and exhibitions, visitors can experience the best of America – its ideals, creativity, and diversity. This American Cultural Center located on the third floor of Pacific Place Mall, Sudirman Central Business District, Jakarta. The technology on display — a giant, supercharged version of Google Earth called Liquid Galaxy, scores of iPads that are available to test, interactive monitors explaining Black History Month — thrilled the teenagers.

Diplomatic missions
The U.S. embassy in Indonesia is located in Jakarta. There are U.S. consulate generals in Surabaya (principal officer: Caryn R. McClelland) and Medan (principal officer: Sean Stein). There is a U.S. consular agency in Denpasar.

The Indonesian embassy in the U.S. is located in Washington D.C., with consulate generals in New York, San Francisco, Los Angeles, Chicago and Houston.

Principal U.S. Embassy officials 

 Ambassador--Sung Kim

Military cooperation 

In 2010, the United States lifted a ban on military contacts with Kopassus, an Indonesian special operations forces involved with human rights abuses in the 1990s.

In January 2018 visit to Jakarta, Secretary of Defense James Mattis stated that Indonesia was a maritime fulcrum in the Asia-Pacific region, and wanted Indonesia and the U.S. to cooperate on issues of maritime security. During that same visit, Secretary Mattis said he believed that Kopassus had reformed sufficiently to justify increased contact with the U.S.

In March 2020, the Trump administration pressured Indonesia into dropping deals to buy Russian made Sukhoi Su-35 fighter jets and Chinese made naval vessels. According to an official familiar with the matter, president Joko Widodo's administration was concerned that the US would take punitive actions on trade and implement economic sanctions against Indonesia if the deals where completed.

Military sales
The United States is a major supplier of military hardware to Indonesia, including of Boeing AH-64 Apache helicopters and the F-16 Fighting Falcon. As of January 2018, Indonesia is exploring purchasing an additional 48 F-16 aircraft, for as much as $4.5 billion.

As of November 2022, US approved Indonesia that would be purchasing F-15EX to replace Sukhoi Su-27 and Sukhoi Su-30.

See also
 Indonesian Americans
 Foreign relations of the United States
 Foreign relations of Indonesia

References

Further reading

 Bootsma, N. "The Discovery of Indonesia: Western (non-Dutch) Historiography on the Decolonization of Indonesia." in Bijdragen tot de Taal-, Land-en Volkenkunde 1ste Afl (1995): 1-22. online in English
 Freise, Christopher. "American grand strategy and US foreign policy towards Indonesia" (PhD. Diss. U of Melbourne 2017) online bibliography on pp. 253–269.
 Hamilton-Hart, Natasha, and Dave McRae. "Indonesia: balancing the United States and China, aiming for independence." (United States Studies Centre at the University of Sydney, 2015) online.
 Inkiriwang, Frega Wenas. "The dynamic of the US–Indonesia defence relations: the 'IMET ban' period." Australian Journal of International Affairs 74.4 (2020): 377-393. online
 Jones, Matthew. Conflict and Confrontation in South East Asia, 1961–1965: Britain, the United States, Indonesia and the Creation of Malaysia (Cambridge UP, 2001).
 Koopmans, Joop W. Historical Dictionary of the Netherlands (Rowman & Littlefield, 2015).
 Krabbendam, Hans, Cornelis A. van Minnen, and Giles Scott-Smith, eds. Four Centuries of Dutch-American Relations: 1609-2009 (SUNY Press, 2009). Excerpt; comprehensive coverage in 1190 pages.
 Loeber, Hans, ed. Dutch-American Relations 1945-1969: A Partnership; Illusions and Facts (1992), scholarly essays
 McMahon, Robert J. Colonialism and Cold War: The United States and the Struggle for Indonesian Independence, 1945–49 (1981)
 McMahon, Robert J. The Limits of Empire: The United States and Southeast Asia Since World War II (Columbia UP, 1999)
 Matray, James I. ed. East Asia and the United States: An Encyclopedia of relations since 1784 (2 vol. Greenwood, 2002). excerpt v 2

 Mokken, Robert J. "Dutch-American comparisons of the “sense of political efficacy”." Quality & Quantity 3.1 (1969): 125-152.
 Murphy, Ann Marie. "US Rapprochement with Indonesia: From Problem State to Partner." Contemporary Southeast Asia 32#3 (2010): 362-87.
 Ricklefs, M.C. A History of Modern Indonesia since c. 1200 (4th ed. Macmillan 2008), a standard survey.
 Roadnight, Andrew. United States Policy Towards Indonesia in the Truman and Eisenhower Years (2002).
 Scott-Smith, Giles, and David J. Snyder. "'A Test of Sentiments': Civil Aviation, Alliance Politics, and the KLM Challenge in Dutch-American Relations." Diplomatic History 37.5 (2013): 917-945.
 Scott-Smith, Giles. "The Ties that Bind: Dutch-American Relations, US Public Diplomacy and the Promotion of American Studies since the Second World War." Hague Journal of Diplomacy 2.3 (2007): 283-305. online
 Simpson, Bradley R. "Denying the 'First Right': The United States, Indonesia, and the Ranking of Human Rights by the Carter Administration, 1976-1980." International History Review 31#4 (2009): 798-826.
 Smith, Anthony L. "A Glass Half Full: Indonesia-US Relations in the Age of Terror." Contemporary Southeast Asia 25#3 (2003): 449-72.
 van Dijk, Cornelis W. "The American Political Intervention in the Conflict in the Dutch East Indies 1945-1949" (Army Command And General Staff College, 2009) online.
 Wardaya, Baskara T. "Diplomacy and Cultural Understanding: Learning from U.S. Policy toward Indonesia under Sukarno." International Journal 67#4 (2012).
 Yang, Eveline. "Indonesian Americans." Gale Encyclopedia of Multicultural America, edited by Thomas Riggs, (3rd ed., vol. 2, Gale, 2014), pp. 401-411. online

Primary sources
 McMahon, Robert J., ed. Foreign Relations of the United States, 1958-1960: Indonesia vol. XVII. Washington, DC: GPO, 1994. online. 
 McMahon, Robert J. ed. Foreign Relations of the United States, 1958-1960: Indonesia. Vol. XVII'' (Washington: GPO, 1994).

External links
Embassy of Indonesia in Washington DC, United States 
Embassy of the United States in Jakarta, Indonesia
Indonesia – US Economic Relations from the Dean Peter Krogh Foreign Affairs Digital Archives
History of Indonesia – U.S. relations

Politics, Public Opinion, and the U.S.-Indonesian Comprehensive Partnership (NBR Special Report, December 2010)
 American-Indonesian Relations: Obama's Indonesia Question
Indonesia U.S.A a new partnership
Obama and Indonesia U.S.A relations
Outlines of foreign relations
Birth of the Republic of Indonesia The first period of Indonesian independence

 
Bilateral relations of the United States
United States